Burnley Bank Hall F.C. was an English association football club.

History
The club competed in the North West Counties League during the 1992/3 season.

References

Defunct football clubs in England
Defunct football clubs in Lancashire
West Lancashire Football League
North West Counties Football League clubs